Tepepa, also known as Blood and Guns, is an Italian epic Spaghetti Western film starring Tomas Milian and Orson Welles. The film was directed by Giulio Petroni. It was co-produced with Spain, where the film was released with the title Tepepa... Viva La Revolución.

Plot 
The government of "comrade" Madero does not satisfy the peon Tepepa, who continues his guerilla 
battle as a revolutionary, against the government troops together with a group of faithful fighters. 
Tepepa is feeling mocked by the ex-revolutionary Madero, who is now head of state. Tepepa finds 
himself several times facing the fearsome chief of police, Colonel Cascorro, and is constantly persecuted by an English doctor, 
Henry Price, eager to avenge a girl from a rich family, with whom the doctor was in love, and whom 
Tepepa had raped, causing her to suicide.

During the last fight Cascorro finally manages to wound Tepepa, who has escaped him several times, 
but in the decisive battle Cascarro is killed by the revolutionary. Meanwhile, the doctor, who despite 
his hatred for Tepepa had remained at the side of the revolutionaries, manages to take revenge on the peon, 
killing him with a scalpel immediately after extracting the bullet from his wound.

The Doctor then packs his horse to leave, only to be shot by Paquito.

The death of Tepepa, however, does not mark the end of the revolution, and others will continue the battle in his place.

Cast 
Tomas Milian as Jesus Maria "Tepepa" Moran
Orson Welles as Colonel Cascorro
John Steiner as Doctor Henry Price
José Torres as Pedro "El Piojo" Pereira
Luciano Casamonica as Paquito
Annamaria Lanciaprima as Maria Virgen Escalande
George Wang as Mr. Chu
Paco Sanz as President Madero
Clara Colosimo as Sergeant's Wife
Giancarlo Badessi as Sergeant
Rafael Hernández as Pedro
Paloma Cela as Consuelo
Ángel Ortiz as Urelio

Production
The film stars Tomas Milian and Orson Welles in opposing roles. Director Giulio Petroni expressed disappointment with Welles. Petroni claimed that the atmosphere on the set was "terrible," and that Welles called Milian (who idolized Welles) a "dirty Cuban".

References

External links

1969 films
1969 Western (genre) films
Spaghetti Western films
Spanish Western (genre) films
Mexican Revolution films
1960s English-language films
English-language Italian films
English-language Spanish films
1960s Italian-language films
1960s Spanish-language films
Films directed by Giulio Petroni
Films scored by Ennio Morricone
Films about revolutionaries
Films shot in Almería
1960s multilingual films
Italian multilingual films
Spanish multilingual films
1960s Italian films